Whittington Green School (formerly The Meadows Community School) is a mixed secondary school located in Old Whittington, Chesterfield in the English county of Derbyshire.

It is a community school administered by Derbyshire County Council, and offers GCSEs, BTECs and ASDAN courses as programmes of study for pupils. It commonly gets the 'Requires Improvement' rating from Ofsted, and was rated one of the worst schools in the UK by the government in 2019.

References

External links
Whittington Green School official website

Secondary schools in Derbyshire
Community schools in Derbyshire